Lukas Finn Pinckert (born 22 January 2000) is a German professional footballer who plays as a right-back for  club SV Elversberg.

References

2000 births
Living people
People from Bad Bramstedt
German footballers
Footballers from Schleswig-Holstein
Association football fullbacks
3. Liga players
Regionalliga players
Hamburger SV II players
FC Viktoria 1889 Berlin players
SV Elversberg players